Sheepmoor is a town in Gert Sibande District Municipality in the Mpumalanga province of South Africa.

The small village of Sheepmoor is known for the case of Sandra Laing, who in 1966 was reclassified from white to coloured by the apartheid government. The Sunday Times newspaper reported that parents of pupils at Sheepmoor school were threatening to withdraw their children if she was admitted to the school.

References 

Populated places in the Msukaligwa Local Municipality